Klier is a surname. Notable people with the surname include:

 Andreas Klier (born 1976), German road racing cyclist
 Cornelia Klier (born 1957), German rower
 Freya Klier (born 1950), German author and film director
 Gerd Klier (1944–2011) German footballer
 John Klier (1944–2007), American historian
 Leo Klier (1923–2005), American basketball player
Philip Adolphe Klier (1845–1911) German photographer in colonial British-Burma
 Richard Klier (1891–?), Czech Olympic sports shooter

German-language surnames
Occupational surnames